Lum You (c. 1861 – January 31, 1902)—sometimes spelled Lum Yu—was an immigrant Chinese laborer and convicted murderer in the Pacific Northwest.  He is famous for being the only person to have been legally executed in Pacific County, Washington, and for his death row prison break supposedly arranged by the very jailers charged with his captivity.

Biography

Lum You was among the many Chinese laborers who came to Washington near the turn of the century.  A proud, sociable dandy, You was well-liked in the White community. He spoke a little English, and acted as an agent between the Chinese workers and their employers.

In 1894 You approached the South Bend police chief, Marion Egbert, complaining that a fellow Chinese resident by the name of Ging had threatened him.  Egbert brushed You off and suggested he deal with the situation himself.  You took this advice, attacking Ging with an axe.  For this act he was convicted of assault; he was fined $500 and was sentenced to a prison term of six months.

In the summer of 1901, You was employed as a cannery worker and living in Bay Center.  While playing cards on August 6 of that year, he was assaulted, threatened, and robbed by Oscar Bloom, a White man with a reputation as a bully.  This time You did not approach the police, but instead immediately took matters into his own hands: he went to his room to retrieve his gun, sought out and shot Bloom in the abdomen, and then fled the scene.  Bloom survived long enough to swear a deathbed affidavit identifying You as his killer.

Public sympathy for You was high, but White employers of the Chinese workers pressed officials for action to be taken against him.  Accordingly, You was arrested on August 7 and in October 1901 was tried and convicted for the murder of Oscar Bloom.  Contrary to the jurors' belief that You would receive a light sentence, the judge ordered that You be hanged.  The execution was scheduled for January 31, 1902.

Even after his conviction You continued to enjoy public support.  Petitions for clemency, one of which was signed by one of the jurors, were sent to the state governor.  County officials sympathized with You, supposedly leaving his cell door unlocked at night and encouraging him to escape.  You eventually did escape, early in the morning of January 14: one news report claimed the improvised lock to his cell door had been picked with the aid of a confederate.  You hid in the environs of South Bend for several days, during which he was hunted by a squad led by sheriff Thomas A. Roney.  On January 15 he was sighted by two men; the following day the county commissioners met and agreed to offer a reward of $200 for You's capture. On January 17 You was finally apprehended by a three-man posse.  You offered no resistance, and when asked how he escaped, said only that the door was open and he walked out.

On January 27 governor Henry McBride rejected one of the petitions for clemency on procedural grounds, and on January 30 confirmed by wire that he would not be commuting You's sentence. Anticipation of the execution became so great that Roney was besieged with requests to attend.  Roney issued 500 invitation cards, some examples of which survive.

You's hanging proceeded as planned inside the courthouse of the county seat, South Bend, on the morning of January 31, 1902.  Though it had been expected that he would break down, You ate fairly well that morning and went to the gallows without assistance.  He bade his friends goodbye and then uttered his last words, to his executioners: "Kill me good."  The trap was sprung by means of a rope which, along with three dummy ropes, extended into an adjoining room.  Each of the four executioners concealed in that room pulled his rope simultaneously, but only the sheriff knew which was the trigger.

You's was the first and only official execution ever to take place in Pacific County. A month after his arrest, a new act of the Washington State Legislature took effect which required executions for any future crimes to be carried out at the Washington State Penitentiary in Walla Walla.

Legacy

Lum You's trial and execution attracted a great deal of contemporary publicity in Pacific County, and has since passed into the realm of folk legend.  His story has been researched and recounted by local historians Ruth Dixon, Willard R. Espy, and Sydney Stevens.  Espy, also a nationally renowned poet, memorialized You in a humorous epitaph.  You was also the subject of a biographical play performed in the early 1980s, The Hanging of Lum You by the Oysterville-based Shoalwater Storytellers.

References

1860s births
1902 deaths
Year of birth uncertain
19th-century Chinese people
20th-century American criminals
20th-century Chinese criminals
20th-century Chinese people
Chinese male criminals
American people convicted of assault
American people executed for murder
Chinese people convicted of murder
Chinese people executed abroad
People convicted of murder by Washington (state)
People executed by Washington (state) by hanging
Chinese escapees
Escapees from Washington (state) detention
Chinese emigrants to the United States
People from South Bend, Washington
Vigilantes